Christabelle is a feminine given name derived from the elements "Christa" which means "follower of Christ/Christian", and "Belle" which means "beautiful". But could be a variant of the name Christina, which is a feminine version of the masculine given name Christian. It may refer to:
Christabelle Borg (born 1992), Maltese singer
Christabelle Howie (born 1969), Indian beauty pageant titleholder
 Christabelle Silje Isabelle Birgitta Sandoo (born 1981), singer and musician, collaborator of Hans-Peter Lindstrøm, e.g. on Real Life Is No Cool 

Feminine given names
Given names of Greek language origin